Legislative elections were held in Guam on Tuesday, November 6, 2018, along with the election for the Guam delegate to the U.S. House of Representatives. Before the election, the Democratic Party held nine of the fifteen seats in the Legislature while the Republican Party held six seats.
The election resulted in a gain of one seat for the Democrats and a loss of one seat for Republicans. Democrats also won the race for Guam's US House Delegate.

Candidates

Democratic

Declared

Declined

Republican

Declined

Primary Election
Primary elections in Guam were held on August 25, 2018. The first 15 candidates who win the highest votes for each party will move on to the general election.

Results

Democratic primary results

Eliminated candidates
Five Democrats hopefuls were eliminated in the 2018 primaries:
Armando S. Dominguez
Maria Lourdes Milligan
Franklin James Meno
Ned Richard Pablo
William M. Parkinson

Republican Party Primary

Eliminated candidates
Four Republican hopefuls were eliminated in the 2018 primaries:
Alfredo Antonin
Javier Atalig
Jeffrey Wheaton
Ryan Jerome "RJ" Calvo

General Election

Results
The members of the legislature are elected at-large with the first 15 winning candidates elected as the new members of the legislature. 
The Democratic Party picked up one seat from Republicans, leaving the composition for the next legislature at 10 Democrats and 5 Republicans. Democrat Michael F.Q. San Nicolas also won the race for Delegate.

Incoming Senators to the 35th Guam Legislature
There were 15 senators elected on November 6, 2018 to serve in the 35th Guam Legislature and were inaugurated on January 7, 2019:

Democratic

Incumbents

Freshman

Republican

Incumbents

Freshman

See also
2018 Guam gubernatorial election
2018 Guam general election

References

2018 elections in the United States
2018 in Guam
Legislative elections in Guam
2018 Guam elections